Juozas Kalinauskas (born January 24, 1935) is a Lithuanian sculptor and medalist.

Biography

He graduated from Vistycio middle school in 1950 and then from 1950 to 1955 Studied in Stepas Zukas art school in Kaunas.
From 1955 to 1961 he studied in Lithuanian State Art Institute Vilnius, and graduated with diploma of a sculptor.

Since 1962 he has been a member of Lithuanian Artist's Association.
From 1962 to 1970 he was art director of the magazine Vilnius fashion house "Banga".

In 1985 he was granted an honorary name of merited artist.

 1996 Member of International federation of medals FIDEM.
 2006 Member of medalist association AIAM in Rome.
 Participating in exhibitions since 1960.

Art work

Sculpture 
 1960 "Sokejele" high relief, music theatre in Kaunas;
 1961 "Rest" reljef, drill factory in Vilniaus;
 1964–1965 "After work" bas-relief, gesso 46x101cm, Museum of fine arts in Vilnius;
 1965 "In sauna" embossed copper, 50x100cm, Museum of fine arts in Moscow;
 1967 "Olympian light" triptych, bas-relief 1x4,5 meters embossed copper, Museum of fine arts in Vilnius;
 1969 "Egle" elm, height – 54 cm;
 1969–1970 "Greeting of cosmonaut" embossed copper, 190x170 cm;
 1972 "Family" bronze, 23 cm;
 1972 "Youth" marble, 100x140 cm;
 1972 "Near the sea" elm, height – 50 cm;
 1975 "Shield of the sun" embossed copper, Ø – 1 meter;
 1975 "Gymnast with ribbons" relief, embossed copper, diameter 100 cm;
 1976 "Women's figure" mahogany, height – 53 cm;
 1976 "Lying" mahogany, 31x65x23 cm;
 1976 "Venus" mahogany, height – 52 cm;
 1976 "A girl with a ball" mahogany, 26x56 cm, Tretyakov state gallery of fine arts, Moscow;
 1978 "Figure" mahogany, 54x28x22 cm;
 1981 "Muse" façade of the Gniecno music school in Moscow, authors: J.Kalinauskas, A.Zokaitis;
 1983 „Partisans” monument, co-author A.Zokaitis, architect G.Baravykas, bronze, 5 meters high;
 1984 „Linute” bust, bronze, height – 26 cm, Tretyakov state gallery of fine arts, Moscow;
 1984 „Linute” bust, elm, height – 26 cm;
 1990 „Germantas” bust, bronze, height – 45 cm;
 1990 „Aida”, “Egle, queen of grassnakes”, „Otelo” façade of the National Opera and Ballet theater in Vilnius, height – 3,2 m;
 1990 „President of Lithuania Antanas Smetona" bas-relief, bronze, height – 42 cm, on independence memorial stela, Vistytis;
 1996 "Sacrifice" bronze, 26x56 cm;
 1996 "Schullman" bust, bronze, base – marble, height – 64 cm, USA, New Jersey;
 2003 "Morning" bronze, 55x26x24 cm;
 2005 "Themis" bronze, height – 60 cm, base – granite;
 2006 "Botanist" bronze, height – 45 cm, base – marble;
 2010 "600 years to the battle of  Žalgiris-Grünwald" co-author Lina Kalinauskaitė, bas-relief, copper, 255x363, 255x726 mm.

Medals
 1964 "Revolt in Lithuania in the year 1863" head, reverse, electrotype, Ø 16 cm;
 1965 "M.K. Čiurlionis" head, reverse, electrotype, Ø 22 cm;
 1973 "The legend of the foundation of Vilnius" copper, electrotype, Ø 16 cm;
 1974 "Ina" medallion, silver, 5x6 cm;
 1978 "Skaidre" medallion, electrotype, Ø 8 cm;
 1979 "Vilnius Model house" aluminium, Ø 12 cm;
 1980 "M.K. Čiurlionis" medallion, silvered copper, 4x5 cm;
 1982 "Goda" copper, electrotype, 12x15 cm;
 1987 "In memoriam of professor B. Pundzius" copper, electrotype, Ø 16 cm;
 1993 "Anniversary of Vilnius – 670 years" head, reverse, electrotype. Ø18 cm;
 1994 "Lithuanian President K. Grinius" copper, electrotype, Ø 19 cm;
 1994 "Lithuanian Premier A. Slezevicius" averse, electrotype, Ø 22 cm;
 1994 "Lithuanian Minister of transport J. Birziskis" averse, electrotype, Ø 19 cm;
 1994 "Member of Lithuanian Parlament A. Albertynas" portraiture, copper, electrotype, Ø 19 cm;
 1996 "Dr. K. Bobelis" head, bronze, Ø 190 mm;
 1997 "Anniversary of Vilkaviskis – 300 years" head, reverse, brass, Ø 22 cm, Lithuanian Mint;
 1997 "In memorial of Arūnas Tarabilda" head, reverse, silvered copper, Ø 20 cm;
 2000 "Evelina Malinauskaitė" electrotype, Ø 16 cm;
 2000 "Tomas Malinauskas" electrotype, Ø 16 cm;
 2000 "Algirdė" medallion, silvered copper, Ø 6 cm;
 2000 "Jubilee medal of millennium" head, reverse, brass, silver Ag 925, Ø 51 mm, Lithuanian Mint;
 2001 "The Medal for the Christian World" head, reverse, brass, silver Ag 925, Ø 51 mm, Lithuanian Mint;
 2002 "World champion R. Bagdonas" head, reverse, brass, Ø 51 mm, Lithuanian Mint;
 2002 "Vice-chairman of Lithuanian Republic C. Juršėnas" copper, Ø 200 mm;
 2002 "Lithuanias christian democracy party celebrates its 100 years" head, reverse, brass, Ø 51 mm, Lithuanian Mint;
 2002 "Maldis art gallery opening, oeuvre of Sauka" head, reverse, brass, Ø 51 mm, Lithuanian Mint;
 2003 "Artist R. Dichavičius", bronze, marble, Ø 16 cm;
 2003 "Woman and a cat" brass, 9x12 cm;
 2003 "Jubilee medal for Lithuanian King Mindaugas" head, reverse, brass, silver Ag 925, Ø 51 mm, Lithuanian Mint;
 2004 "Jubilee medal for Lithuanian Queen Morta" head, reverse, brass, silver Ag 925, Ø 51 mm, Lithuanian Mint;
 2005 "Edmundas Armoska 60 years jubilee" head, reverse, brass, Ø 51 mm, Lithuanian Mint;
 2005 "Dr. Pranas Kiznis ♦ Lietpak – 15 years jubilee" head, reverse, brass, Ø 51 mm, Lithuanian Mint;
 2006 "Jubilee medal 770 years to battle of Saulė-Šiauliai" head, reverse, brass, silver Ag 925, Ø 51 mm, Lithuanian Mint;
 2006 "Radvila the Black" co-author Lina Kalinauskaitė, head, reverse, brass, silver Ag 925, Ø 51 mm, Lithuanian Mint;
 2006 "Archangel Michael" co-author Lina Kalinauskaitė, head, reverse, brass, silver Ag 925, Ø 51 mm, Lithuanian Mint;
 2007 "Archangel Gabriel" co-author Lina Kalinauskaitė, head, reverse, brass, silver Ag 925, Ø 51 mm, Lithuanian Mint;
 2007 "Archangel Raphael" co-author Lina Kalinauskaitė, head, reverse, brass, silver Ag 925, Ø 51 mm, Lithuanian Mint;
 2009 "Medal Signifying the Millennium Commemoration of the Name of Lithuania 1009–2009"  co-author Lina Kalinauskaitė, head, reverse, brass, silver Ag 925, Ø 70mm, Lithuanian Mint;
 2010 "Jubilee medal 600 years to the battle of  Žalgiris-Grünwald" co-author Lina Kalinauskaitė, obverse, reverse, brass, silver Ag 925, Ø 51 mm, Lithuanian Mint.

Public and private collections
 "Olympic light" Museum of fine arts of Lithuania, Vilnius;
 "Gymnast with ribbons" A. Grenda's private collection;
 "Sacrifice" Mrs. Fokiene private collection, Vilnius;
 "Near the sea" Association of Lithuanian writers, Vilnius;
 "In sauna", "The legend of the foundation of Vilnius" Museum of fine arts, Moscow;
 "Linute", "Youth"  Tretyakov state gallery of fine arts, Moscow;
 "Dr. J.Schulman" private collection of Mrs. E.Schulman, United States, New Jersey;
 "Algirdas and Kestutis" private collection, Japan;
 Various historical medals at Trakai history museum, Trakai;
 And other private collections in Lithuania and abroad.

Exhibitions
 1965 Anniversary exhibition of art in Vilnius;
 1966 Competitive exhibition of Lithuania;
 1967 Republican exhibition in Vilnius;
 1969–1970 International exhibition of medals in Prague;
 1972 Quadrienal in Riga;
 1972 Personal exhibition in Vilnius;
 1975 Kraków, international exhibition of medals;
 1976 Quadrienal in Riga;
 1984 Confederate exhibition in Moscow;
 1985 GTG exhibition in Moscow;
 1985 GKG exhibition in Moscow;
 1986–1987 exhibition in Moscow;
 1987–1988 II Republican exhibition in Vilnius;
 1991 III Republican exhibition in Vilnius;
 1993 Republican exhibition of medals in Vilnius;
 1994 September, personal exhibition in Vilkaviskis, Krastieciu hall;
 1998 November, personal exhibition in Vilnius, Atzalynas club hall;
 1998 Medal exhibition FIDEM in Netherlands;
 2002 Medal exhibition FIDEM in Paris;
 2002 Sculpture symposium at the St. Jono gallery, Vilnius;
 2000–2005 Medal exhibitions at the St. Jono gallery, Vilnius;
 2006 Personal exhibition at the St. Jono gallery, Vilnius;
 2007 VII Baltic Medal Triennial, Vilnius;
 2007 FIDEM in Colorado Springs USA;
 2007 February, exhibition at "Korperhaft-Erotische Impressionen" in Daetz-Centrum, Lichtenstein, Germany;
 2008 AIAM medal exhibition in Rome;
 2009 May, Exhibition dedicated to commemorate the Millennium of Lithuania's Name at the palace of Radvilu, Vilnius;
 2009 September, Exhibition in Vilnius' town hall;
 2009 October, Republican exhibition of medals in Vilnius.

Awards
 1966 First award for "Olympian light";
 1966 Second award for "The fight";
 1969 Third award for "Greeting of cosmonaut" in Moscow;
 1976 Diploma from Moscow for the medal "The legend of the foundation of Vilnius";
 1984 "Grekov name" medal, silver;
 1985 Granted an honorary name of merited artist;
 1993 Award in competition of the medals, for the medal "Vilnius 670 years".

References
 International Art Medal Federation
 World Wide Arts Resources – absolutearts.com
 Lithuanian Artists Association
 Lithuanian History newspaper "Voruta"
 ALFA news portal
 Lithuanian Millenium Portal
 Vilkaviskis District Municipality
 Lithuanian Art Museum

External links
 Official Juozas Kalinauskas website

1935 births
Living people
20th-century Lithuanian sculptors
Male sculptors
20th-century male artists
21st-century Lithuanian sculptors
21st-century male artists
Medallists